Laureys may refer to:

 Steven Laureys, Belgian neurologist
 Jimmy Laureys, Belgian powerlifter and strongman competitor
 Laureys a Castro, Flemish painter of marine views and portraits

See also
 Laurey (disambiguation)